is Japanese voice actress and singer Maaya Uchida's 13th single, released on April 20, 2022. The titular song from the single was used as the ending theme for the anime Miss Shachiku and the Little Baby Ghost.

Track listings

Charts

Event 
 『 Maaya Party！14』　Maaya Uchida 13th Single Release Event「Maaya Party！14」（May 21, 2022 - May 28, 2022：Osaka, Aichi, Tokyo）

References

2022 singles
2022 songs
J-pop songs
Japanese-language songs
Pony Canyon singles
Anime songs